Prevoje is a small settlement north of Blagovica in the Municipality of Lukovica in the eastern part of the Upper Carniola region of Slovenia.

References

External links

Prevoje on Geopedia

Populated places in the Municipality of Lukovica